FC Hazovyk Komarno is a football club from Komarno, Lviv Raion, Ukraine. In 1992–2001 the club participated in the Ukrainian championship.

In 2004 another club Hazovyk-Khurtovyna was founded that participates in regional championships.

Honours
Lviv Oblast Football Championship
Winners (1): 1990

Competitions

Managers
 1992 Volodymyr Zhuravchak
 1992–1993 Stepan Yurchyshyn
 1993 Ivan Pukalskyi
 1993–1994 Viktor Khodukin
 1994–1995 Yuriy Dyachuk-Stavytskyi
 1996 Mykhailo Vilkhovyi
 1996 Borys Rassykhin
 1997–2001 Yuriy Dubrovnyi

 
Amateur football clubs in Ukraine
Football clubs in Komarno, Ukraine
Football clubs in the Ukrainian Soviet Socialist Republic
FC Lviv
Association football clubs established in 1925
1925 establishments in Poland